The 2016 Best of Nollywood Awards was the 8th edition of the ceremony and took place in Aba, Abia State on 10 December 2016. The event was to be hosted by Okey Bakassi and Mercy Aigbe, with the latter not showing up on the award night. Awards were given in 32 categories, with Adesua Etomi, Beverly Naya, Gabriel Afolayan and Alexx Ekubo amongst the winners. 
 
The nominee list was released in November 2016 by head of jury, Niran Adedokun. Hire a Man and Something Wicked led the nomination list with nine nominations. Eni-Owo and A Soldier's Story followed with seven. The lifetime achievement awards for special contribution to the development of Nollywood was given to Sola Sobowale, Fidelis Duker and Chika Okpala, popularly known as "Chief Zebrudaya" from The Village Masquerade.

Awards

References 

2016 in Nigerian cinema
Nollywood
2016